Cuddle was an outstanding New Zealand Thoroughbred racemare that won a large number of major races including the 1935 and 1936 Auckland Cups in race record time. She went to Australia in 1936, where she won a number of races including the Doncaster Handicap.

Cuddle was a filly foaled in 1929 by the good racehorse and sire, Psychology (GB) out of the place-getter, Caress (NZ) by the leading sire, Martian.

Her regular rider in New Zealand was Jim Ellis.  When she went to Australia she was ridden by expatriate New Zealanders Keith Voitre and Maurice McCarten.

Principal race wins
 1935 Auckland Cup, ridden by Jim Ellis.
 1935 ARC King's Plate
 1935 New Zealand Cup, Jim Ellis.
 1935 WRC Summer Handicap
 1936 All Aged Stakes, Maurice McCarten
 1936 Doncaster Handicap (carrying 58 kg, a record for a mare until Sunline achieved it, and only two horses have carried more weight since, Super Impose (59) and Gunsynd with 60.5), Maurice McCarten.
 1936 Auckland Cup, Jim Ellis.
 1936, 1937 ARC Clifford Plate
 1936 ARC King's Plate
 1936 St George Stakes, Keith Voitre.
 1937 CJC Canterbury Cup

Cuddle was the dam eight foals, seven raced, with six winners, including the Principal Race winners:
 Beau Cheval (won Adelaide Cup etc.),
 Gamble (Timaru Cup)

She has the “Cuddle Stakes” named after her, a race for fillies and mares run at Trentham Racecourse.

See also

 Thoroughbred racing in New Zealand
 Thoroughbred racing in Australia

References

1929 racehorse births
Auckland Cup winners
Racehorses bred in New Zealand
Racehorses trained in New Zealand
New Zealand Cup winners
Thoroughbred family 20-a
New Zealand Racing Hall of Fame horses